The SWARM Remote Weapon System (Stabilised Weapon And Reconnaissance Mount) is a fully armored remote weapon system designed and built by the Thales Group in Glasgow, Scotland. The SWARM system consists of two main assemblies: the Gun Processing and Interface Unit (GPIU), which is operated inside the vehicle, and the external Weapon and Sensor Platform (WASP). It can fire a variety of weapons, and utilize  multiple sensors. On the US Marine Corps' Gladiator Tactical Unmanned Ground Vehicle (TUGV), it is equipped with a 7.62 mm M240 and day/night sensors.

Currently used in conjunction with:
US Marine Corps Gladiator Tactical Unmanned Ground Vehicle (TUGV)
British Army Trojan AVRE
FNSS Pars Armored Vehicle

Specifications
System Accuracy: Less than 1.5 milliradians (mil) (10 round burst)
Minimum Tracking Speed: 0.01 degrees per second.

References

Vehicle weapons
Remote weapon stations